The 34th Croatia Division (Serbo-Croatian Latin: Tridesetčetvrta hrvatska divizija) was a Yugoslav Partisan division formed on 30 January 1944 on Žumberak mountains. It was formed from the 16th Youth Brigade and Franjo Ogulinac Seljo Brigade which had a total of 3,363 fighters. The division was part of the 4th Corps and it operated in Žumberak, Pokuplje, Turopolje and the northern parts of Kordun i Banija.

References 

Divisions of the Yugoslav Partisans
Military units and formations established in 1944